WWWE (1100 kHz) is a commercial AM radio station licensed to Hapeville, Georgia and serving the Atlanta metropolitan area. Owned by Beasley Broadcasting Group, Inc., the station airs an urban adult contemporary/talk/sports radio format, with some hours of the broadcast day being paid brokered programming.  WWWE is co-owned with WAEC in Atlanta, Georgia.

WWWE is considered as a Class D station according to the Federal Communications Commission. It broadcasts with 5,000 watts of power during the daytime and 3,800 watts during critical hours, using a non-directional antenna.  Because AM 1100 is a clear-channel frequency reserved for Class A WTAM in Cleveland, WWWE must sign-off at night to avoid interference.  The transmitter is located off Fayetteville Road Southeast, near Interstate 20 in Atlanta.

History
On August 30, 1996, one Atlanta-area station switched frequencies, making way for another.  AM 1100 WLBB Carrollton, Georgia, moved to 1330 kHz and the 1100 kHz signal became the home of a new station, WWWE, licensed to Hapewell.  In April 2003, WWWE began carrying the Spanish language evangelical Christian religious format known as "Radio Vida." The station was later re-branded as "La Poderosa 1100 AM," carrying a Mexican ranchera music format.  In June 2013, the station was branded as "Radio Fiesta Mexicana" and began carrying a regional Mexican music format.

History of the WWWE callsign

This station is not related to the current WTAM in Cleveland, which held the WWWE call sign from 1972 until 1996 and broadcast on the same 1100 kHz frequency. Today's WWWE must sign off at night to avoid interference with WTAM, which is a 50,000 watt clear channel station, according to the Federal Communications Commission.

Broadcasting in the hybrid digital mode

This station has the equipment for broadcasting in the IBOC digital radio mode, using the HD Radio system from iBiquity. Several other stations owned by the Beasley Broadcast Group use the HD Radio system. On October 13, 2005, WWWE submitted a notice to the Federal Communications Commission of its intention to start digital broadcasting. The station began broadcasting using the HD Radio AM hybrid mode system between 2006 and 2007 on a test basis, but has not continued using this system since.

References

External links

WWE
WWE
Radio stations established in 1996
WWE
WWE